Saddletowne station is a CTrain light rail station in on the Northeast Line (Route 202) in Saddle Ridge Calgary, Alberta. Opened on August 27, 2012 as part of a 2.9-km extension. 

It is the current terminus of the N.E. line and is located in the northwest corner of Saddletowne Circle N.E., a large roundabout where the Saddleridge Town Centre a commercial and activity centre, with planned medium-density residential development and community facilities.  The station has a Park and Ride with a 141-stall capacity.

The station is a center-loading, walk-on island platform.

Construction on the extension started in the spring of 2010 and completed, for its grand opening block party, on August 25, 2012. The extension was delayed by almost one year, as it was initially planned to open in late 2011.

In its first year of service, Saddletowne served an average of 8,730 boardings per day.

References

CTrain stations
Railway stations in Canada opened in 2012
2012  establishments in Alberta